Brian Gibbons may refer to:

Brian Gibbons (politician) (born 1950), Welsh politician
Brian Gibbons (ice hockey, born 1947), Canadian retired professional ice hockey player
Brian Gibbons (ice hockey, born 1988), American professional ice hockey player

See also
Brian Gibson (disambiguation)